Jessica Ho and Wang Xiyu were the defending champions, but chose not to participate.

Kyōka Okamura and Moyuka Uchijima won the title, defeating Marina Bassols Ribera and Yvonne Cavallé Reimers in the final, 7–6(9–7), 6–4.

Seeds

Draw

Draw

References
Main Draw

Trofeu Internacional Ciutat de Barcelona - Doubles